Evan Jones (born 5 June 2004) is a Scottish swimmer.

Jones was born in Scotland, to English parents.

In 2022, Jones swam butterfly in the British  relay team which won gold at the European Junior Swimming Championships.

References

2004 births
Living people
British male freestyle swimmers
British male butterfly swimmers
Scottish male freestyle swimmers
Commonwealth Games bronze medallists for Scotland
Commonwealth Games medallists in swimming
Medallists at the 2022 Commonwealth Games
Swimmers at the 2022 Commonwealth Games
Scottish people of English descent